Mansusan is a mountain of Chungcheongnam-do, western South Korea. It has an elevation of 575 metres.

See also
List of mountains of Korea

References

Mountains of South Korea
Mountains of South Chungcheong Province